Human Waste Project was an American alternative metal band from Huntington Beach, California. It was formed in December 1993 by bassist Jeff Schartoff and guitarist Roman Marisak, and after going through several shifts in personnel, the band's lineup solidified in 1994 with Schartoff, drummer Scott Ellis, vocalist Aimee Echo and guitarist Mike Tempesta.

Human Waste Project signed with Hollywood Records in June 1996, who released their debut album, E-lux, in September 1997. Although the album's poor promotion of the album prevented it from becoming a commercial success, it received warm reviews from critics, and relentless touring and strong support from Kerrang! magazine helped Human Waste Project cultivate a cult following. The band also managed to make an appearance on second stage of Ozzfest UK in June 1998, after being dropped by Hollywood two months prior.

Shortly after the band's performance at Ozzfest, Aimee Echo quit Human Waste Project due to creative differences, resulting in the band's breakup in July 1998. Between 2008 and 2009, the members of Human Waste Project had a few partial reunions, although the band never formally reformed.

History

1993–1998: Formation, E-lux and breakup 
Human Waste Project was formed in December 1993 by Jeff Schartoff and Roman Marisak. However, Marisak and Schartoff lost contact, and Schartoff subsequently went about recruiting a new line-up. After recruiting drummer Scott Ellis, vocalist Aimee Echo joined the band after being asked by Ellis and Schartoff, who she was sharing a ride with to Lollapalooza, if she could scream. They initially also had another vocalist, Michael Walsh, who departed from the group in 1994, leaving Echo as the sole vocalist. John Monte joined as guitarist but did not last long and they went through a string of guitarists, one of whom was John Chase of Cellophane before finding Mike Tempesta. The group began opening for large name bands such as Sublime, Helmet, Deftones, and Korn and struck a deal with Hollywood Records on June 6, 1996. The band also toured the UK with Tura Satana and Coal Chamber respectively in 1997 before playing the UK Ozzfest in June 20, 1998. This trip awarded them press coverage that they did not find in the United States. Features with the band (particularly Aimee) were found in the European rock magazines, most notably Kerrang!.

Despite the band's success in the UK, the band's singer Aimee Echo was becoming disillusioned with the band due to her dislike with the band being typecast as just a heavy metal or nu metal act, as well as with E-lux's failure; this resulted in her quitting Human Waste Project in July 1998 following their performance at Ozzfest. As a result, Human Waste Project announced their disbandment, and they played their last official show at the House of Blues in Los Angeles on July 8, 1998. Aimee Echo and Scott Ellis went on to form theSTART. Jeff Schartoff formed Professional Murder Music and joined Peter Murphy's live band. Mike Tempesta joined Powerman 5000.

2008–2009: Reunions 
On Aimee Echo's birthday, March 27, 2008, after a theSTART show at Crash Mansion in downtown Los Angeles, the remaining three HWP members came on stage and played "Dog" and "Shine" with her. In attendance were former members of Snot, Sevendust, Craig Riker of Deadsy, producer Ross Robinson and Chibi of The Birthday Massacre.

Human Waste Project had a publicized reunion show at the Key Club in West Hollywood on October 10, 2008, as the opening act for Snot. Three of the four original members were present (theSTART drummer Chelsea Davis filled in at the last minute for Scott Ellis). Their set list consisted of most of the songs off E-Lux and a cover of Depeche Mode's "I Feel You". Aimee stated that this would be the only full scale reunion show and the band would not be getting back together to tour.

Another mini-reunion occurred on July 9, 2009, at a theSTART show at The Roxy in West Hollywood. Mike Tempesta joined them mid-set to perform "Dog" and "One Night In Spain". The latter being a song theSTART have performed during their own shows.

On August 3, 2009, Mike Tempesta was announced on stage by Aimee Echo as being in the audience of a theSTART show in New York City at the Mercury Lounge. He joined them and performed one song.

Discography
Studio albums

Singles
"Powerstrip" (UK: number 85)

References

External links 
Official website (archived)

1993 establishments in California
Alternative rock groups from California
American alternative metal musical groups
Musical groups from Los Angeles
Musical groups established in 1993
Musical groups disestablished in 1998
Musical groups reestablished in 2008
Musical groups disestablished in 2009
Nu metal musical groups from California